The Peheim transmitter is a facility of Deutsche Telekom AG used for FM and TV transmission. It is located northeast of Peheim at 52°53'17" N, 7°50'59" E. The transmitter, which is often incorrectly referred to as the Cloppenburg transmitter, consists of a  guyed lattice steel mast, which is guyed in four levels.

Radiated FM-programmes

Furthermore, the FM frequency 99.5 MHz is coordinated for the Peheim transmitter.

TV (DVB-T)

Before the digital switchover in December 2005, the SAT.1 programme was broadcast on channel 48, and those of RTL on channel 51 with 5 kW ERP.

Radio masts and towers in Germany
Buildings and structures in Lower Saxony